Amber "Holly" Boykins (born April 4, 1969) is an American politician. She represented a portion of North St. Louis in the Missouri House of Representatives. She is a Democrat

Boykins is a St. Louis native. She graduated from Cardinal Ritter College Preparatory High School in 1987 and from Columbia College in 1991. She is currently pursuing both an MBA and a JD.

Boykins was elected State Representative in 1998 in a closely contested Democratic primary election  and was elected without opposition in the general election . She was re-elected in 2000, 2002, and 2004.

Due to term limits Boykins was unable to seek re-election in 2006. She announced her candidacy for the 4th District State Senate seat being vacated by Pat Dougherty. Other announced candidates were fellow State Representative Yaphett El-Amin, former State Representative Derio Gambaro, former St. Louis Alderman Kenny Jones, and political science professor Jeff Smith. The primary election was held on August 8, 2006, and was won by Jeff Smith, who was unopposed in the general election.

External links
State of Missouri page for Rep. Boykins

African-American state legislators in Missouri
African-American women in politics
Democratic Party members of the Missouri House of Representatives
Politicians from St. Louis
1969 births
Living people
Columbia College (Missouri) alumni
Women state legislators in Missouri
Delta Sigma Theta members
21st-century African-American people
21st-century African-American women
20th-century African-American people
20th-century African-American women